The Country Girl may refer to:
 The Country Girl (1766 play), a play by David Garrick
 The Country Girl (1915 film), a 1915 silent film, based on the Garrick play 
 The Country Girl (1950 play), a play by Clifford Odets
 The Country Girl (1954 film), a 1954 film based on the Odets play, starring Bing Crosby and Grace Kelly
 The Country Girl (Hallmark), a 1974 presentation in the Hallmark Hall of Fame
 The Country Girls,   Edna O'Brien's first novel  1960

See also
 A Country Girl, a long-running British 1902 musical 
Country Girl (disambiguation)